Kaleburcu is a village in Tarsus district of Mersin Province, Turkey. It is almost merged to Tarsus. Distance to Mersin is .The population of Kaleburcu is 1005 as of 2011.

References

Villages in Tarsus District